Bairoa may refer to:

Places
Bairoa, Aguas Buenas, Puerto Rico, a barrio
Bairoa, Caguas, Puerto Rico, a barrio